Loriol-sur-Drôme (literally Loriol on Drôme; Vivaro-Alpine: L’Auriòu de Droma) is a commune in the Drôme department in southeastern France.

Loriol is situated in the Rhône valley, between Valence and Montélimar. 
The neighbouring villages are Livron-sur-Drôme, Mirmande,  and Cliousclat.

History
Roman emperor Aurelian is said to have based a camp here. The medieval fortress was destroyed in the wars of religion, leaving only the ramparts.

During World War II, Loriol was heavily damaged by Allied bombing in August 1944.

Population

See also
Communes of the Drôme department

References

Communes of Drôme